Evening Shade is an American television series.

Evening Shade may also refer to:

Evening Shade, Arkansas, a city
Evening Shade, Scott County, Arkansas, an unincorporated community
Evening Shade, Missouri, an unincorporated community
Evening Shade, Oklahoma, a census-designated place
"Evening Shade", a song by Dolly Parton from her 1969 studio album My Blue Ridge Mountain Boy